Early Medieval Europe is a quarterly peer-reviewed academic journal covering the history of Europe from the later Roman Empire to the eleventh century. It is published by John Wiley & Sons.

Abstracting and indexing
The journal is abstracted and indexed by:
EBSCO databases
Arts & Humanities Citation Index
British & Irish Archaeological Bibliography
Current Contents/Arts & Humanities
GEOBASE
International Bibliography of Periodical Literature
ProQuest databases
Scopus

References

External links

 Roy Flechner and Francesca Tinti, 'EME’S 30th Anniversary: Interviews with Editors Past' (June 2022)

European history journals
Quarterly journals
English-language journals
Wiley (publisher) academic journals
Publications with year of establishment missing